Mont-Sainte-Geneviève is a village of Wallonia and a district in the municipality of Lobbes, located in the province of Hainaut, Belgium.

External links
 

Former municipalities of Hainaut (province)